Mary Trump could refer to:

 Mary Anne MacLeod Trump (1912–2000), mother of U.S. President Donald Trump
 Mary L. Trump (born 1965), psychologist and author; niece of Donald Trump

See also 
 Maryanne Trump Barry (born 1937), American jurist; sister of Donald Trump and daughter of Mary Anne MacLeod Trump